UFC: Ortiz vs. Shamrock 3: The Final Chapter (also known as UFC Fight Night 6.5) was a mixed martial arts event held by the Ultimate Fighting Championship on October 10, 2006. The event took place at the Seminole Hard Rock Hotel and Casino in Hollywood, Florida and was broadcast live on Spike TV in the United States and Canada.

Background
The main event featured the third and final encounter between Tito Ortiz and Ken Shamrock.  At UFC 61, the two fighters met for a second time, with Ortiz reigning victorious via technical knockout. However, some critics contend that the fight was stopped too early by referee Herb Dean.  At the UFC 62 weigh-ins, UFC President Dana White announced the third Ortiz-Shamrock encounter. Tickets went on sale on Tuesday, August 29, 2006, and sold out in two days.

The two-hour broadcast drew a 3.1 overall rating, with the main event of Tito Ortiz and Ken Shamrock fighting for a third time drawing a 4.3 rating. Quoting MMA Weekly's Ivan Trembow, "That breaks down to an amazing 5.7 million viewers for the Ortiz vs. Shamrock fight. This shatters the UFC's previous record for the number of people watching a UFC fight at any given time." The overall ratings record would not be matched until UFC 75 on September 8, 2007.

Results

Bonus awards 
Fighters were each awarded $30,000 bonuses.
 Fight of the Night: Matt Hamill vs. Seth Petruzelli
 Knockout of the Night: Tito Ortiz
 Submission of the Night: Jason MacDonald

See also
 Ultimate Fighting Championship
 List of UFC champions
 List of UFC events
 2006 in UFC

References

External links
 Official UFC Website

UFC Fight Night
2006 in mixed martial arts
Mixed martial arts in Florida
Sports in Hollywood, Florida
2006 in sports in Florida
Events in Hollywood, Florida